Tom Woods (born August 10, 1961) is an American politician who served as a member of the Montana House of Representatives from the 62nd district from 2013 to 2021. He is a member of the Democratic Party. In 2016, he was elected as House minority caucus chair.

References

Living people
1961 births
Democratic Party members of the Montana House of Representatives
21st-century American politicians